The final of the Women's Triple Jump event at the 2003 Pan American Games took place on Friday August 8, 2003.

Medalists

Records

Results

See also
2003 World Championships in Athletics – Women's triple jump
Athletics at the 2004 Summer Olympics – Women's triple jump

Notes

References
Results

Triple jump, Women
2003
2003 in women's athletics